Irina Vyacheslavovna Nikolaeva (born 26 September 1983) is a Russian former figure skater. She won three gold medals on the ISU Junior Grand Prix series and qualified for two JGP Finals, where she finished as high as fourth. She also placed fourth at the 1999 World Junior Championships.

Nikolaeva competed at two senior internationals, the 1998 Skate Israel and the 2001 Finlandia Trophy, placing sixth and eighth respectively. She retired from competition in 2002 and then toured professionally.

Programs

Competitive highlights

References

External links 
 

Russian female single skaters
1983 births
Living people